Centaurea nigra is a species of flowering plant in the family Asteraceae known by the common names lesser knapweed, common knapweed and black knapweed. A local vernacular name is hardheads.

It is native to Europe but it is known on other continents as an introduced species and often a noxious weed.

Although the plant is often unwanted by landowners because it is considered a weed by many, it provides a great deal of nectar for pollinators. It was rated in the top five for most nectar production (nectar per unit cover per year) in a UK plants survey. It also placed second as a producer of nectar sugar per floral unit, among the meadow perennials, in another study in Britain.

Description
It is a herbaceous perennial growing up to about a metre in height.

The lower leaves are stalked, whilst the upper ones are stalkless.

The inflorescence contains a few flower heads, each a hemisphere of black or brown bristly phyllaries. Each head bears many small bright purple flowers. The fruit is a tan, hairy achene 2 or 3 millimetres long, sometimes with a tiny, dark pappus. It flowers from July until September.
The flowers sometimes are yellow or white

Wildlife value
In Europe, the plant is an important source of food for the European goldfinch, honey bee,  lime-speck pug moth, and the following butterflies: large skipper, meadow brown, small heath, painted lady, peacock, red admiral, small copper and small skipper.

In the UK study published by the peer-reviewed journal PLOS One, the plant was even more noteworthy for being the top producer of both nectar and pollen, when the amount of each were compared with the pollen production of the highest nectar producers and vice versa. Of the six species that produced more nectar than this plant, none of them produced a significant amount of pollen. The top producer of nectar was ragwort and the top producer of pollen was corn poppy.

Similar species
Brown knapweed (Centaurea jacea) is different in having pale brown bract appendages, no pappus.  Flowers August until September. Centaurea ×moncktonii, is a fertile hybrid between black knapweed and brown knapweed.

References
Natural England Website description

External links
 
 
 
 
 
 
 USDA Plants Profile

nigra
Flora of Europe
Flora of Morocco
Plants described in 1753
Taxa named by Carl Linnaeus